Per Aspera Ad Astra is the fourth studio LP by Stars of the Lid. It was made in collaboration with artist Jon McCafferty and released on Kranky in 1998.  Widely known in music circles as the artist behind the cover of R.E.M.'s Green, McCafferty approached Stars of the Lid with a view towards collaboration after working on a series of paintings inspired by the duo's 1995 debut Music for Nitrous Oxide.  The title is a common Latin phrase translatable as "through hardships, to the stars."

Liner notes
Stars of the Lid elaborated on the album's reasoning on its inner sleeve.

Critical reception

John Bush, writing for Allmusic, stated:

Track listing
"Low Level (Listening)+, Part 1" – 6:22
"Low Level (Listening)+, Part 2" – 8:42
"Low Level (Listening)+, Part 3" – 5:29
"Anchor States, Part 1" – 4:27
"Anchor States, Part 2" – 8:51
"Anchor States, Part 3" – 6:46

Personnel
Adam Wiltzie
Brian McBride
S. Nelson
B. Anderton
C. McCaffrey

References

1998 albums
Stars of the Lid albums
Kranky albums
Instrumental albums